Hafez El-Hussein is a retired Syrian athlete. He competed in the men's javelin throw at the 1988 Summer Olympics. He was a bronze medalist in the javelin throw at the 1987 Mediterranean Games.

References

External links
 
 Hafez El-Hussein at Olympedia

1959 births
Living people
Athletes (track and field) at the 1988 Summer Olympics
Syrian male javelin throwers
Olympic athletes of Syria
Place of birth missing (living people)
Mediterranean Games bronze medalists for Syria
Mediterranean Games medalists in athletics
Athletes (track and field) at the 1987 Mediterranean Games
20th-century Syrian people